Gerrard Follon (16 March 1919 – 1993) was a Scottish professional footballer who played as a full back.

Career
Born in Dundee, Follon played for Lochee Harp, Dundee, St Johnstone and Keith.

Follon died in Dundee in 1993, at the age of 73.

References

1919 births
1993 deaths
Scottish footballers
Lochee Harp F.C. players
Dundee F.C. players
St Johnstone F.C. players
Keith F.C. players
Scottish Football League players
Association football fullbacks
Scottish Football League representative players
Date of death missing